Asiab Sham (also Romanized as Āsīāb Sham‘) is a village in Kharajgil Rural District, Asalem District, Talesh County, Gilan Province, Iran. At the 2006 census, its population was 169, in 37 families.

References 

Populated places in Talesh County